The Huading Awards are a set of entertainment awards in China. The awards were set up by Tianxia Yingcai Cultural Media Co., LTD in 2007 in Beijing and are held more than once each year across multiple entertainment media from Chinese television shows to international films and music.

History 
The 1st Huading Awards poll was held on December 17, 2007. The name Huading, Hua comes from The Biography of Book of Documents, it also means the Chinese nation; Ding comes from Records of the Grand Historian, it means word carries weight.

On October 7, 2013, the 10th Huading Awards ceremony was held in Macao.

On June 1, 2014, the 12th Huading Awards ceremony was held at the Ricardo Montalbán Theatre in Hollywood. On December 15, 2017, the 21st Huading Awards were held at the Ace Hotel Los Angeles.

Ceremonies

There are four main ceremonies held under the Huading Awards.

 Huading Award China Film Satisfaction Survey Release Ceremony (中国电影满意度调查发布盛典)  – Film
The 5th, 9th, 12th, 16th, 20th, 21st editions are under this ceremony.
 Huading Award "The Night of Cadillac" Top 100 TV Series Satisfactory Survey Release Ceremony (中国百强电视剧满意度调查盛典) – Television
 The 4th, 6th, 8th, 13th, 17th, 19th editions are under this ceremony.
 Huading Night Release Ceremony of Public Image Survey of China Performing Celebrity (演藝名人滿意度調查)  – Film, TV, Music
The 1st, 2nd, 3rd, 7th, 10th, 15th, 18th editions are under this ceremony.
 Huading Award Global Music Satisfaction Survey (华鼎奖全球音乐满意度调查颁奖盛典) – Music
The 11th and 14th editions are under this ceremony.

Award results
Award results for editions not listed in their own article.

Film
Also known as China Film Satisfaction Survey Release Ceremony (中国电影满意度调查发布盛典)

21st edition

20th edition

16th edition

12th edition

9th edition

5th edition

Public Image Survey

18th edition

15th edition

10th edition

Music
Also known as the Huading Award Global Music Satisfaction Survey.

14th edition

11th edition

See also

 List of Asian television awards
 List of film festivals in China

References

External links

 
Chinese film awards
Chinese television awards
Awards established in 2007
Film festivals in China
2007 establishments in China
Recurring events established in 2007